The Est 613 to 742 were 0-6-2T locomotives for suburban passenger traffic of the Chemins de fer de l'Est.
They were first put in service in 1881.

Construction history
The first series of 10 machines (Est 613 – 622) was built in 1880–1881 in the workshops of the Est at Épernay.
The locomotives proved satisfactory, and so further machines were built by SACM (Est 623 – 673) and Cail (Est 674 – 683), reaching a total of 71 machines in 1884.

In 1890 a new series of 9 machines (Est 684 – 692) was built at Épernay Works. These locomotives had increased in size, with firebox and heating area as well as boiler pressure increased.
In the years 1892–1895 the locomotive stock was further augmented with new batches (Est 693 – 742) of the same type, finally reaching a total of 130 machines in 1895.

In 1905 twenty-five locomotives of the earlier series (Est 613 – 637) were modified for shunting and were renumbered as Est G 613 – G 637.

The machines Est 638–746, 667–683 and 734–742 remained in their original state. In 1929 the first machines (Est 600, 639, 640) were withdrawn. 14 machines were still in service on 1 Jan 1938 and were renumbered to SNCF 031 TA 641–741.

References

Bibliography

 

Steam locomotives of France
613
Railway locomotives introduced in 1881
0-6-2T locomotives

Passenger locomotives